"Gotta Be You" (Korean: 너아님안돼; RR: Neo anim andwae) is a song recorded by South Korean girl group 2NE1 and is the second Korean-language single from the group's final studio album Crush. The track peaked at number 3 on the Gaon Digital Chart and was ranked number 42 for the most downloaded songs in South Korea in 2014. The song was the last single that 2NE1 released as a quartet, before Minzy's departure from the group in April 2016.

The Japanese version of the track was also included in the Japanese version of Crush, which was released on June 25, 2014.

Background 

"Gotta Be You" is described as a synthy dance-pop song with elements of hip-hop and EDM. The track was written by long-time YG Entertainment collaborator Teddy Park and was co-produced by Park, Masta Wu, and P.K.

The music video for the song was released on May 21, 2014, at 9:00 KST, and was uploaded "to celebrate their fifth anniversary of their debut." The music video combines elements of Roy Lichtenstein's comic books and Andy Warhol's "Brillo Boxes" along with splashes of graffiti, emoticons and neon seen throughout the set. 2NE1 teamed up with fashion designer Jeremy Scott for the "pop art-inspired video". It featured English model Ash Stymest as CL's love interest.

Promotions and live performances
The song was performed twice on SBS's Inkigayo along with the album's first Korean-language single "Come Back Home". The dance practice video was uploaded to the group's official YouTube channel on March 17. "Gotta Be You" was also featured on the setlist for their All or Nothing World Tour that spanned from March, following the release of the album, to October.

Credits
Credits adapted from Tidal.
Personnel
2NE1 – Vocals
Teddy Park –  Lyricist, composer, arranger
Masta Wu – Arranger
Choi Pil-kang (P.K.) – Composer

Chart performance

Weekly charts

Monthly charts

Year-end charts

Release history

References

2014 songs
2NE1 songs
Korean-language songs
YG Entertainment singles
Songs written by Teddy Park
2014 singles